Dragan Hasanagić is a retired Slovenian footballer.

External links
Profile at PrvaLiga 

1965 births
Living people
Footballers from Ljubljana
Slovenian footballers
Association football defenders
NK Ljubljana players
NK Olimpija Ljubljana (2005) players
NK Svoboda Ljubljana players
Slovenian PrvaLiga players